Carya ovata, the shagbark hickory, is a common hickory in the Eastern United States and southeast Canada. Mature shagbarks are easy to recognize because, as their name implies, they have shaggy bark. This characteristic is, however, only found on mature trees; young specimens have smooth bark.

The shagbark hickory's nut is edible and has a very sweet taste.

The shagbark hickory is monoecious. Staminate flowers are borne on long-stalked catkins at the tip of old wood or in the axils of the previous season's leaves. Pistillate flowers occur in short terminal spikes. The terminal buds on the shagbark hickory are large and covered with loose scales. Shagbark hickory nuts were a significant food source for the Algonquins. Red squirrels, gray squirrels, raccoons, chipmunks, and mice are consumers of hickory nuts. Other consumers include  black bears, gray and red foxes, rabbits, and bird species such as mallards, wood ducks, bobwhites, and wild turkey.

The two varieties are:

Some sources regard southern shagbark hickory as the separate species Carya carolinae-septentrionalis.

Name
The word hickory is an aphetic form from earlier pohickory, short for even earlier pokahickory, borrowed from the Virginia Algonquian word pawcohiccora, hickory-nut meat or a nut milk drink made from it. Other names for this tree are Carolina Hickory, Scalybark Hickory, Upland Hickory, and Shellbark Hickory, with older binomial names of Carya ovata var. fraxinifolia, Carya ovata var. nuttallii, Carya ovata var. pubescens, Hicoria alba, Hicoria borealis, and Hicoria ovata.

Distribution 
Shagbark hickory is found throughout most of the eastern United States, but it is largely absent from the southeastern and Gulf coastal plains and lower Mississippi Delta areas.  An isolated population grows in eastern Canada as far north as Lavant Township, Canadian zone 4b.  Scattered locations of shagbark hickory occur in the Sierra Madre Oriental of eastern Mexico.

Shagbark hickory was introduced in Europe in the 17th century. It can still be found in Central Europe as a non-native species.

Uses 

The nuts are edible with an excellent flavor, and are a popular food among people and squirrels alike. They are unsuitable to commercial or orchard production due to the long time it takes for a tree to produce sizable crops and unpredictable output from year to year. Shagbark hickories can grow to enormous sizes but are unreliable bearers. The nuts can be used as a substitute for the pecan in colder climates and have nearly the same culinary function.

C. ovata begins producing seeds at about 10 years of age, but large quantities are not produced until 40 years and will continue for at least 100. Nut production is erratic, with good crops every 3 to 5 years, in between which few or none appear and the entire crop may be lost to animal predation.

Andrew Jackson, the seventh president of the United States, was popularly nicknamed Old Hickory, a play on the toughness of hickory wood. In 1830, he began planning the construction of his tomb at The Hermitage, his plantation in Tennessee. The grave site was surrounded by a variety of trees, including six shagbark hickories. They stood there for 168 years until a storm in 1998 demolished over 1,200 trees at the site. Work on replanting them remains an ongoing project. In modern times, shagbark hickory is rarely used as an ornamental due to its large size, slow growth, difficulty of transplanting (all Juglandaceae species have large taproots) and nut litter.

Hickory nuts were a food source for Native Americans, who used the kernel milk to make corn cakes, kanuchi and hominy.

Shagbark hickory wood is used for smoking meat and for making the bows of Native Americans of the northern area.  The lumber is heavy, hard, and tough, weighing 63 lb/ cu ft when air-dried, and has been employed for implements and tools that require strength.  These include axles, axe handles, ploughs, skis, and drum sticks.

The bark of the shagbark hickory is also used to flavor a maple-style syrup.

Genetics 
Shagbark hickory hybridizes with pecan, Carya illinoensis, and shellbark hickory, C. laciniosa (C. x dunbarii Sarg.). Shagbark hickory has 32 chromosomes. In general, species within the genus with the same chromosome number are able to cross. Numerous hybrids among the Carya species with 32 chromosomes (pecan, bitternut, shellbark, and shagbark) have been described, though most are unproductive or have other flaws.  A few hican varieties are commercially propagated.

Gallery

References

External links 

Carya ovata images at the Arnold Arboretum of Harvard University Plant Image Database
Schoonderwoerd, Kristel. "Spotlight on seasonal shifts in trees." Arnold Arboretum of Harvard University website, 8 April 2019. Accessed 21 May 2020.
Carya ovata at Flora of North America
Comparison of Shagbark, Southern Shagbark, and Kingnut Hickory at bioimages.vanderbilt.edu
Carya carolinae-septentrionalis (= Carya ovata var. australis ) images at bioimages.vanderbilt.edu
Shagbark hickory fact sheet at Virginia Dept of Forest Resources (photos of leaves, bark, nut and twig)
 Carya ovata - information, genetic conservation units and related resources. European Forest Genetic Resources Programme (EUFORGEN)

ovata
Edible nuts and seeds
Trees of the Southeastern United States
Trees of Eastern Canada
Trees of humid continental climate
Trees of the North-Central United States
Trees of the Eastern United States
Trees of the United States
Trees of Ontario
Trees of the Northeastern United States
Trees of the Great Lakes region (North America)
Trees of Mexico
Plant dyes
Flora of the Sierra Madre Oriental